SSZ may refer to:

 The IATA airport code for Santos Air Base in Santos, São Paulo, Brazil
 Spaceship Zero
 Sulfasalazine
 Hyundai Separated Sound Zone
 Serbian Party Oathkeepers (Srpska stranka Zavetnici)